Jonathan P. Bowen FBCS FRSA (born 1956) is a British computer scientist and an Emeritus Professor at London South Bank University, where he headed the Centre for Applied Formal Methods. Prof. Bowen is also the Chairman of Museophile Limited and has been a Professor of Computer Science at Birmingham City University, Visiting Professor at the Pratt Institute (New York City), University of Westminster and King's College London, and a visiting academic at University College London.

Early life and education
Bowen was born in Oxford, the son of Humphry Bowen, and was educated at the Dragon School, Bryanston School, prior to his matriculation at University College, Oxford (Oxford University) where he received the MA degree in Engineering Science.

Career
Bowen later worked at Imperial College, London, the Oxford University Computing Laboratory (now the Oxford University Department of Computer Science), the University of Reading, and London South Bank University. His early work was on formal methods in general, and later the Z notation in particular. He was Chair of the Z User Group from the early 1990s until 2011. In 2002, Bowen was elected Chair of the British Computer Society FACS Specialist Group on Formal Aspects of Computing Science. Since 2005, Bowen has been an Associate Editor-in-Chief of the journal Innovations in Systems and Software Engineering. He is also an associate editor on the editorial board for the ACM Computing Surveys journal, covering software engineering and formal methods. From 2008–9, he was an Associate at Praxis High Integrity Systems, working on a large industrial project using the Z notation.

Bowen's other major interest is the area of online museums. In 1994, he founded the Virtual Library museums pages (VLmp), an online museums directory that was soon adopted by the International Council of Museums (ICOM). In the same year he also started the Virtual Museum of Computing. In 2002, he founded Museophile Limited to help museums, especially online, for example with discussion forums. He has also worked in industry at Oxford Instruments, Marconi Instruments, Logica, Silicon Graphics, and Altran Praxis.

Bowen was elected a Fellow of the Royal Society for the encouragement of Arts, Manufactures and Commerce (RSA) in 2002 and of the British Computer Society (BCS) in 2004. He is a Liveryman of the Worshipful Company of Information Technologists and a Freeman of the City of London.

Selected books
Jonathan Bowen has written and edited a number of books, including:

 Bowen, J.P., editor, Towards Verified Systems. Elsevier Science, Real-Time Safety Critical Systems series, volume 2, 1994. .
 Hinchey, M.G. and Bowen, J.P., editors, Applications of Formal Methods. Prentice Hall International Series in Computer Science, 1995. .
 Bowen, J.P., Formal Specification and Documentation using Z: A Case Study Approach. International Thomson Computer Press, International Thomson Publishing, 1996. .
 Bowen, J.P. and Hinchey, M.G., editors, High-Integrity System Specification and Design. Springer-Verlag, London, FACIT series, 1999. .
 Hinchey, M.G. and Bowen, J.P., editors, Industrial-Strength Formal Methods in Practice. Springer-Verlag, London, FACIT series, 1999. .
 Hierons, R., Bowen, J.P., and Harman, M., editors, Formal Methods and Testing. Springer-Verlag, LNCS, Volume 4949, 2008. .
 Börger, E., Butler, M., Bowen, J.P., and Boca, P., editors, Abstract State Machines, B and Z. Springer-Verlag, LNCS, Volume 5238, 2008. .
 Boca, P.P., Bowen, J.P., and Siddiqi, J.I., editors, Formal Methods: State of the Art and New Directions. Springer, 2010. , e-, .
 Bowen, J.P., Keene, S., and Ng, K., editors, Electronic Visualisation in Arts and Culture. Springer Series on Cultural Computing, Springer, 2013. .
 Copeland, J., Bowen, J.P., Sprevak, M., Wilson, R., et al., The Turing Guide. Oxford University Press, 2017.  (hardcover),  (paperback).
 Hinchey, M.G., Bowen, J.P., Olderog, E.-R., editors, Provably Correct Systems. Springer International Publishing, NASA Monographs in Systems and Software Engineering series, 2017. , .
 Giannini, T. and Bowen, J.P., editors, Museums and Digital Culture: New Perspectives and Research. Springer Series on Cultural Computing, Springer, 2019. , e-, .

References

External links

 Personal website
 
 

 Jonathan P. Bowen on Microsoft Academic
 

1956 births
Living people
People from Oxford
People educated at The Dragon School
People educated at Bryanston School
Alumni of University College, Oxford
Computer science writers
English computer scientists
English non-fiction writers
English book editors
Formal methods people
Members of the Department of Computer Science, University of Oxford
Academics of Imperial College London
Academics of the University of Reading
Academics of London South Bank University
Academics of University College London
Academics of King's College London
Academics of the University of Westminster
Academics of Birmingham City University
Silicon Graphics people
British software engineers
Software engineering researchers
Academic journal editors
Fellows of the British Computer Society
English male non-fiction writers